Neun Welten (meaning Nine Worlds in German, which relates to the nine worlds of Norse mythology) is a German music group primarily incorporating instrumental acoustic, traditional folk and dark folk in their music.
The musical style is composed of dark folk, dreamy but also playful melodies and classical elements. The point of main emphasis of this young band from Halle and Leipzig is the acoustical orchestration. The sound carry off the audience in a calm atmosphere full of harmony and melancholy.

In 2005, Neun Welten was designated for the German Folk Award "RUTH 2005" in the Newcomer category.

In 2007 they went on tour with Finnish band Tenhi and Dornenreich/Elane.

The band also contributed their song Pan to Prophecy Productions' multi-artist compilation Whom the Moon a Nightsong Sings, published in 2010.

Line-up
 Anja Hövelmann - recorder, clarinet
 Aline Deinert	- violin, piano
 David Zaubitzer - acoustic guitar, cello
 Marten Winter	- drums, percussion
 Meinolf Müller - acoustic guitar, jaw harp

Discography

Albums And EPs

Compilations

References

External links

Official
Official Neun Welten Site
  Neun Welten at Myspace.com

German folk music groups
Neofolk music groups